The following highways are numbered 439:

Japan
 Japan National Route 439

United States
  Florida State Road 439
  County Road 439 (Hernando County, Florida)
  Louisiana Highway 439
  Maryland Route 439
  Nevada State Route 439
  New Jersey Route 439
  New York State Route 439 (former)
  New York State Route 439A (former)
  Pennsylvania Route 439 (former)
  Puerto Rico Highway 439